Hogolua kondorum is a minute species of air-breathing land snails, terrestrial pulmonate gastropod mollusks in the family Zonitidae.

This species is endemic to Micronesia.

References

Fauna of Micronesia
Hogolua
Gastropods described in 1941
Taxonomy articles created by Polbot